Humnabad railway station, (station code: HMBD)   is an Indian Railways Train station located in Humnabad, Bidar in the Indian state of Karnataka and serves Humnabad  area. It is located on the Bidar-Kalaburagi line of Secunderabad railway division in South Central Railway zone.

History 
Bidar–Gulbarga Railway Line foundation stone for the project was laid in 1996, construction began in 2000 .The work completed in two phases. Phase one push-pull train service between Bidar and Humnabad started in 2013.The second phase between Humnabad and Gulbarga delayed due to land acquisition in Gulbarga, as farmers went to court seeking higher compensation, and on 29 October 2017 the full line flagged off between Bidar and Gulbarga (Kalaburagi).

Structure and expansion 
Humnabad railway station has two platforms, each running to 400 meter in length, computerized reservation counter, waiting room, tea stall, parking, foot overbridge, and toilet facilities. Humnabad has connectivity with Kalaburagi and Bidar.

References

Secunderabad railway division
Railway stations in Bidar district
Railway stations in Karnataka